Stanley Webber Jackson (17 November 1920 – 24 May 2000) was a notable psychiatrist and Professor Emeritus of Psychiatry and History of Medicine at Yale University.  He wrote two titles: Melancholia and Depression: From Hippocratic Times to Modern Times (Yale University Press, 1986) and Care of the Psyche: A History of Psychological Healing (Yale University Press, 1999). Jackson died on 24 May 2000

References 

American psychiatrists
Historians from Connecticut
1920 births
2000 deaths
American medical historians
20th-century American historians